Cape Barrow is a cape which separates Coronation Gulf from Bathurst Inlet in Nunavut, Canada. It is named in honour of the arctic explorer Sir John Barrow, and is referred to as Haninnek by the local Inuit.

Along with Cape Flinders, it was named in 1821 by Sir John Franklin.

Gallery

References

Barrow